This is the discography of Swedish singer and songwriter Benjamin Ingrosso. He competed twice in Melodifestivalen in 2017 and 2018 respectively. He won in 2018 and represented Sweden in the Eurovision Song Contest 2018 in Lisbon, Portugal, with the song "Dance You Off". In September 2018, he released his debut studio album Identification. The album peaked at number one on the Swedish Albums Chart. In January 2021, he released his second studio album and first Swedish-language album En gång i tiden, which also peaked at number one on the Swedish Albums Chart. The follow-up album En gång i tiden (del 2), released in April 2021, also peaked at number one on the Swedish Albums Chart.

Albums

Studio albums

Live albums

Compilation albums

Extended plays

Singles

As lead artist

As featured artist

Promotional singles

Other appearances

Other charted songs

Songwriting credits

Notes

References

Discographies of Swedish artists